Byfleet & New Haw railway station is on the London to Woking line, operated by South Western Railway. The station is at the northern edge of Byfleet with the village of New Haw immediately to the north and the M25 motorway within  to the west.

History
The station was designed by the architect James Robb Scott and opened on 10 July 1927 to cater for the increasing local population. The opening of the Vickers aircraft factory in 1911 led to Byfleet's population doubling in just ten years. Many new houses were built to accommodate the factory workers.

The station was originally called "West Weybridge" and changed to its present name in June 1962.

It is on a section of railway that forms part of the South West Main Line's original form, the London and Southampton Railway, which was built in stages. The first stage opened in May 1838 and joined the London Terminus in Nine Elms with Woking Common, now Woking.

Byfleet and New Haw Station is in close proximity to the historical Brooklands racetrack and aerodrome, which date back to 1907. The racetrack hosted the 1927 British Grand Prix a few months after the station opened.

Service
At off-peak times there are two trains per hour north and two trains per hour south.  Currently the services to Woking are usually at 00 and 30 minutes past the hour and those to London at 10 and 40 minutes past the hour. The station has two platforms and is predominantly served by stopping trains on the Woking to London Waterloo via Surbiton service. At peak times there are three or four trains an hour to London Waterloo. On Sundays and late evenings/early mornings there is an additional service to Waterloo via Staines.
As Byfleet and New Haw is one of the earlier stops on the Waterloo line, passengers getting on here stand a very good chance of getting a seat. Access for disabled passengers is difficult as passengers travelling in either direction need to negotiate a long staircase. There is no wheelchair access.

Ticket office and station staff
Byfleet and New Haw's ticket office is staffed on a part-time basis but has no platform staff. There is an automated ticket machine at the bottom of the first staircase.

Ticket Office Opening Hours

Refurbishment

In March 2013, work began to refurbish the booking hall, subway and stairwells at the station. Works were completed in August 2013.

Notes

References

External links

Railway stations in Surrey
DfT Category E stations
Railway stations in Great Britain opened in 1927
Former Southern Railway (UK) stations
Railway stations served by South Western Railway
James Robb Scott buildings